Truro Trehaverne is an electoral division of Cornwall in the United Kingdom and returns one member to sit on Cornwall Council. The current Councillor is David Harris, a Conservative and the deputy leader of the Conservative group on the council.

Extent
Truro Trehaverne covers the west and north west of the city of Truro, including the suburbs of Treliske (but not the Royal Cornwall Hospital complex), Kenwyn and parts of Highertown (which is shared with the Truro Redannick division). The division covers 334 hectares in total.

Election results

2017 election

2013 election

2009 election

References

Electoral divisions of Cornwall Council
Politics of Truro